Escadrille Spa.159 was a French fighter squadron supporting VIII Armee during 1918. It was credited with destroying 11 German airplanes and an observation balloon.

History
Escadrille Spa.159 (original designation Escadrille N.159) began on 16 January 1918 with a draft of personnel from Escadrille N.90. Assigned to VIII Armee,  they were incorporated into Groupe de Combat 20 in late February. In May, it replaced its Nieuport fighters with SPAD XIIIs; its unit designation was altered to Escadrille Spa.159.

Escadrille Spa.159 saw combat at the Battle of Saint-Mihiel. By war's end, the squadron had been credited with destroying 11 German airplanes and an observation balloon.

Commanders
 Lieutenant Albert Roper: 16 January 1918
 Lieutenant Georges Mazimann: 22 June 1918 - killed in action 20 July 1918
 Lieutenant Henri Hay De Slade: 28 July 1918 - 11 November 1918

Notable member
 Lieutenant Henri Hay De Slade

Aircraft
 Nieuport fighters: 16 January 1918
 SPAD XIII fighters: late February 1918.

End notes

Reference
 
 

Squadrons of the French Service Aéronautique in World War I
Military units and formations established in 1918
Military units and formations disestablished in 1918